Anita Allen (born September 10, 1977 in Star City, Indiana) is a United States Army medical service officer who competed in the 2004 Olympic Games in the modern pentathlon, where she finished 18th of 32 competitors.  A 2000 graduate of West Point, Allen finished first in the riding portion of the event.  She was a standout cross country runner while at the academy. She won the women's modern pentathlon on August 11, 2003 at the 2003 Pan American Games.

Gallery

References

External links 
 
 
 

1977 births
Living people
American female modern pentathletes
Olympic modern pentathletes of the United States
Modern pentathletes at the 2004 Summer Olympics
United States Military Academy alumni
Female United States Army officers
Pan American Games medalists in modern pentathlon
Pan American Games gold medalists for the United States
Modern pentathletes at the 2003 Pan American Games
Medalists at the 2003 Pan American Games
21st-century American women
U.S. Army World Class Athlete Program